Provincial Trunk Highway 25 (PTH 25) is a provincial highway in the Canadian province of Manitoba. PTH 25 serves as the major route, via PTH 10, between Rivers and Brandon. 

History 
PTH 25 was designated originally in 1928 from PTH 2 east of Carroll to Brandon. In 1929, it extended south to Boissevain, replacing PTH 20. In 1937, it extended south to the North Dakota border. In 1938, this route became part of PTH 10. 

PTH 25 was designated in 1953 along its current route.

Intersections

External links 
Manitoba Official Map - Southwest

025